Creixomil e Mariz is a civil parish in the municipality of Barcelos, Portugal. It was formed in 2013 by the merger of the former parishes Creixomil and Mariz. It has an area of 6.98 km², and its population in 2011 was 1,208.

References

Freguesias of Barcelos, Portugal